The United States Army has 40 military installations in Germany, two of which are scheduled to close. Over 220 others have already been closed, mostly following the end of the Cold War in the 1990s. The rationale behind the large number of closures is that the strategic functions of the bases, designed to serve as forward posts in any war against the USSR, are no longer relevant since the end of the Cold War.

Existing installations
Artillery Kaserne, Garmisch-Partenkirchen 
Barton Barracks, Ansbach 
Bismarck Kaserne, Ansbach
Bleidorn Housing Area, Ansbach
Coleman Barracks, Mannheim
Dagger Complex, Darmstadt Training Center Griesheim (scheduled to close after the new one in Wiesbaden is built)
Edelweiss Lodge and Resort, Garmisch-Partenkirchen
Lucius D. Clay Kaserne (formerly Wiesbaden Army Airfield), Wiesbaden-Erbenheim
Germersheim Army Depot, Germersheim
Grafenwöhr Training Area, Grafenwöhr/Vilseck
Joint Multinational Readiness Center, Hohenfels (Upper Palatinate)
Husterhoeh Kaserne, Pirmasens
Kaiserslautern Military Community
Katterbach Kaserne, Ansbach
Kelley Barracks, Stuttgart
Kleber Kaserne, Kaiserslautern Military Community
Landstuhl Regional Medical Center, Landstuhl
McCully Barracks, Wackernheim
Miesau Army Depot, Miesau
Oberdachstetten Storage Area, Ansbach
Panzer Kaserne, Kaiserslautern
Panzer Kaserne, Böblingen
Patch Barracks, Stuttgart
Pulaski Barracks, Kaiserslautern
Rhine Ordnance Barracks, Kaiserslautern
Robinson Barracks, Stuttgart 
Rose Barracks, Vilseck
Sembach Kaserne, Kaiserslautern
Sheridan Barracks, Garmisch-Partenkirchen
Shipton Kaserne, Ansbach
Smith Barracks, Baumholder
Spangdahlem Air Force Base, Spangdahlem
Storck Barracks, Illesheim
Stuttgart Army Airfield, Filderstadt
Mainz-Kastel Storage Station (scheduled to close in 2022)
USAG Wiesbaden Military Training Area, Mainz, Gonsenheim/Mombach
USAG Wiesbaden Training Area, Mainz Finthen Airport
USAG Wiesbaden Radar Station, Mainz Finthen Airport
Urlas Housing and Shopping Complex, Ansbach (converted from Urlas Training Area in early 2010s)
Tower Barracks Dülmen, Dülmen

Former installations

References

External links

Installations in Germany
 
 
United States Army installations in Germany, list of
US Army